Concejo is a Spanish word literally meaning "council". It may refer to

 Concejo (Álava), a type of administrative subdivision in the province of Álava, Spain
 A synonym of municipio (municipality) in Asturias, Spain; see List of municipalities in Asturias

See also
 Concejo abierto